Trinca may refer to:

Trinca Airport
Trinca, Edineț, village in Moldova
Trinca (comic), Spanish comic 1970-1973
Trinca's, famous restaurant on Park Street, Kolkata
Helen Trinca, Australian journalist
Jasmine Trinca (1981), Italian actress